Middle Age Crazy is a 1980 American-Canadian comedy film directed by John Trent, and starring Bruce Dern and Ann-Margret. The film was nominated for two awards (Worst Director and Worst Screenplay) at the 1st Golden Raspberry Awards.

Plot
Bobby Lee Burnett lives a simple suburban life with his wife, Sue-Ann, whose efforts to please him include having orgasms that end with her saying: "Bingo." After she throws a party for his 40th birthday, Bobby undergoes a serious mid-life crisis. He changes his wardrobe, buys a car and begins an affair with another woman. Sue tolerates it for a while and gets her own fling. However, Bobby returns home and thanks Sue for everything.

Cast 
Bruce Dern as Bobby Lee Burnett
Ann-Margret as Sue Ann Burnett
Graham Jarvis as J.D.
Deborah Wakeham as Nancy Henerson
Eric Christmas as Tom Burnett
Helen Hughes as Ruth Burnett
Geoffrey Bowes as Greg
Michael Kane as Abe Titus 
Diane Dewey as Wanda Jean
Vivian Reis as Becky
Patricia Hamilton as Barbara Pickett
Anni Lantuch as Janet 
Gina Dick as Linda McAllister
Thomas Baird as Porsche Salesman
Norma Dell'Agnese as Valedictorian
Shirley Soloman as Condo Saleswoman
Elias Zarou as Priest
Michele Chiponski as Topless Dancer
Jack Mather as Minister
Jim Montgomery as Nancy's Boyfriend
John Facenda as Sportscaster

References

External links 
 
 

1980 films
20th Century Fox films
American comedy films
1980 comedy films
English-language Canadian films
Canadian comedy films
Films set in Texas
Films directed by John Trent (director)
Midlife crisis films
1980s English-language films
1980s American films
1980s Canadian films